Rangunia Khilmogal Rashik High School is a secondary school in Rangunia, Chittagong, Bangladesh. It is located at No.3 Swanirvar, Rangunia Union, West Shabak Rangunia village.

History 
In 1926 the school was established on land donated by Rasik Chandra Chowdhury. The school later acquired land donated by Talukder Abdul Shobana and Virendra Lal Paul.

The school got its first academic recognition from the University of Calcutta in 1944. Haji Azizur Rahman served as headmaster at the school in 1950–56.

References 

Schools in Chittagong District